Raili Anita Hillevi Laiho  (born 24 October 1933) is a Finnish former competitive swimmer. She represented Finland in the women's 100 metre freestyle and women's 4 × 100 metre freestyle relay at the 1952 Summer Olympics in Helsinki.

References

External links
 
 

1933 births
Living people
Finnish female freestyle swimmers
Olympic swimmers of Finland
People from Ulvila
Sportspeople from Satakunta
Swimmers at the 1952 Summer Olympics